Eðvaldsson is an Icelandic surname. Notable people with the surname include:

 Atli Eðvaldsson (1957–2019), Icelandic footballer
 Jóhannes Eðvaldsson (born 1950), Icelandic footballer
 Jón Halldór Eðvaldsson

Icelandic-language surnames